Park Se-jik (born 25 May 1989) is a South Korean footballer who plays as a midfielder for Chungnam Asan FC.

References

External links 

Park Se-jik at Incheon United FC 

Incheon United FC players
1989 births
Living people
Association football midfielders
South Korean footballers
Jeonbuk Hyundai Motors players
Asan Mugunghwa FC players
K League 1 players
K League 2 players
Hanyang University alumni
People from Changwon
Sportspeople from South Gyeongsang Province